A Merry Mix-Up is a 1957 short subject directed by Jules White starring American slapstick comedy team The Three Stooges (Moe Howard, Larry Fine and Joe Besser). It is the 177th entry in the series released by Columbia Pictures starring the comedians, who appeared in 190 shorts for the studio between 1934 and 1959.

Plot
The Stooges play three sets of identical triplets, born one year apart. All nine brothers lose track of each other after World War II, unaware that they are all living in the same city. One set (Moe, Larry and Joe) is single, one (Max, Louie and Jack) is married, and the other (Morris, Luke and Jeff) is engaged. The brothers can be told apart by their neckwear (the single set wears striped ties, the married wear no ties, and the engaged set wear bow ties).

Trouble brews when the engaged set of brothers decided to celebrate at a local nightclub. Before they arrive, the unmarried set show up, followed by the fiancees of their brothers. The ladies start hugging and kissing the unsuspecting brothers. Within minutes, the wives of the married brothers show up, thinking their husbands are cheating on them. Believing that their fiancees are already married, the girls give the single brothers the engagement rings before the three leave. As soon as the brothers leave, the engaged set shows up and the girls let them have it. When the wives get back to their husbands, who have been cooking all day, they agree to go back to the club to prove they were never there. Naturally, the waiter (Frank Sully) believes that they were there, and when the wives let their husbands have it, the engaged set shows up. After a reunion and introduction, the engaged brothers explain that they were beaten by their fiancees, but did not see the wives. The fiancees then return and see the six brothers; altering seemingly working out the confusion, the girls ask for their rings. When more confusion brews, the unmarried brothers arrive, and give the girls back their rings. The entire group decides to go back to the married sets' house to celebrate the reunion, while the married brothers ask the waiter (who has been knocked unconscious the whole time) for some drinks. The furious waiter then chases the group, and hilarity sets in when the engaged set and then the single set come in; the waiter only sees one set at a time, and assumes that there is just one set of brothers. In the end, the waiter sees all nine brothers simultaneously and hits himself with his cleaver.

Cast

Credited
 Moe Howard as Moe, Max and Morris
 Larry Fine as Larry, Louie and Luke
 Joe Besser as Joe, Jack and Jeff

Uncredited
 Frank Sully as Waiter and Narrator
 Nanette Bordeaux as May
 Jeanne Carmen as Mary
 Ruth Godfrey White as Leona
 Suzanne Ridgeway as Jill
 Harriette Tarler as Letty
 Diana Darrin as Jane

Production notes
A Merry Mix-Up was filmed on May 14–16, 1956; it is a remake of Laurel and Hardy's Our Relations (1936). Felix Adler provided the screenplay for both films.

The closing matte shot featuring all nine brothers standing side by side took careful planning to expose perfectly, giving the effect of three Moes, Larrys and Joes. To achieve this, each Stooge had to stand behind a specific marker before each shot was taken. For the final exposure, director Jules White suspected that Larry Fine was standing behind the wrong marker when compared to the previous two exposures. Larry knew White was wrong, and went to great lengths to prove it. Luckily, Larry prevailed, and saved the studio from having to refilm thousands of dollars worth of exposures.

References

External links 
 
 
A Merry Mix-Up at threestooges.net

1957 films
1957 comedy films
The Three Stooges films
American black-and-white films
Films directed by Jules White
Columbia Pictures short films
1950s English-language films
1950s American films